RADC may be:
 Rome Air Development Center, the former name of the United States Air Force's Rome Laboratory
Royal Army Dental Corps, part of the British Army
Rush Alzheimer's Disease Center, a research center at Rush University